Ophryoterpnomyia is a genus of picture-winged flies in the family Ulidiidae.

Species
 O. zikani

References

Ulidiidae